Mickey Keating (April 12, 1931 – January 19, 2004) was a Canadian professional ice hockey player and executive. While a player, he played the defenceman position. After his playing career, he became Coach and General Manager of the Flin Flon Bombers and was an Assistant General Manager with the New York Rangers. Keating was born in Winnipeg, Manitoba.

Awards and achievements
IHL Championships (1953, 1954, 1960, & 1961)
WHL  Championship (1956)
Edinburgh Trophy Championship (1956)
"Honoured Member" of the Manitoba Hockey Hall of Fame

External links

Mickey Keating's biography at Manitoba Hockey Hall of Fame

1931 births
2004 deaths
Canadian ice hockey defencemen
Flin Flon Bombers players
Ice hockey people from Winnipeg
New York Rangers executives
Winnipeg Canadians players